The 42d Tactical Missile Squadron is an inactive United States Air Force unit, formed in 1985 by the consolidation of two units.  The first is the 2d Search Attack Squadron, which tested antisubmarine warfare tactics and equipment at Langley Field, Virginia during World War II.  The second is the 942d Forward Air Control Squadron, which was activated following the Korean War, but does not appear to have been equipped or manned.  The consolidated squadron has not been active.

History

World War II
The first predecessor of the squadron was activated at Langley Field, Virginia as the 2d Search Attack Squadron.  The squadron was primarily equipped with Douglas B-18 Bolos.  It tested electronic equipment and trained crews for its use in antisubmarine operations; antisubmarine patrols, July 1942 until late 1943."

Cold War
The second predecessor of the squadron is the 942d Forward Air Control Squadron, which was activated as the Korean War was ending in June 1953. With the end of the war the following month, it apparently was not manned or equipped  until it was inacrivated in March 1954.

The two squadrons were consolidated in September 1985 as the 42d Tactical Missile Squadron.

Lineage
 2d Search Attack Unit
 Constituted as the 2d Search Attack Squadron (Medium) on 8 June 1942
 Activated on 17 June 1942
 Redesignated 2d Sea-Search Attack Squadron (Heavy) on 24 June 1943
 Redesignated 2d Search Attack Squadron (Heavy) on 22 November 1943
 Disbanded on 10 April 1944
 Reconstituted and consolidated with the 942d Forward Air Control Squadron as the 42d Tactical Missile Squadron on 19 September 1985

 942d Forward Air Control Squadron
 Constituted as the 942d Forward Air Control Squadron on 18 March 1953
 Activated 20 June 1953
 Inactivated on 8 March 1954
 Consolidated with the 2d Search Attack Squadron as the 42d Tactical Missile Squadron on 19 September 1985

Assignments
 1st Sea-Search Attack Group (later 1st Sea-Search Attack Unit, 1st Search Attack Group)]], 17 June 1942 – 10 April 1944
 Air echelon attached to I Bomber Command, 17-23 Apr 1942

Stations
 Langley Field, Virginia, 17 June 1942 – 10 April 1944 operated from: Naval Air Station Key West, Florida, 17–23 August 1942; Rdinburgh Field, Trinidad, 20 September-21 October 1942
 Chunchon Air Base, South Korea, 20 Jun 1953-8 Mar 1954

Aircraft
 North American B-25 Mitchell, 1942
 Douglas B-18 Bolo/ 1942–1943
 Lockheed B-34 Ventura, 1943–1944

See also

 List of United States Air Force missile squadrons

References

Notes

Bibliography

External links
 42d Tactical Missile Squadron

External links

042